Parliamentary elections were held in Azerbaijan on 5 November 2000, although a re-run had to be held in 11 constituencies on 7 January 2001 due to "massive irregularities". The result was a victory for the New Azerbaijan Party, which won 75 of the 125 seats.

Results

References

Parliamentary elections in Azerbaijan
Azerbaijan
Azerbaijan
Azerbaijan
Azerbaijan
Parliamentary
Parliamentary
Election and referendum articles with incomplete results